Transnational Information and Consultation of Employees Regulations 1999 (TICER; SI 1999/3323) is a UK labour law that requires employers to inform and consult employees on significant changes to businesses in a standing procedure. This is called a transnational work council, and is available if the employer operates in two or more European Union member states. TICER 1999 implement the European Works Council Directive, and operates primarily where US multinational corporations employ people in Europe.

Contents

See also

European labour law
UK labour law

Notes

References
Original regulations
Amendments to regulations

European Union labour law
United Kingdom labour law
Statutory Instruments of the United Kingdom